R07 can refer to:
HMS Albion (R07)
ATC code R07
HMS Ark Royal (R07)